Sungkyunkwan University (SKKU or simply Seongdae, Hangul: 성균관대학교; Hanja: 成均館大學校) is a private comprehensive research university in South Korea. The institution traces its origins to the historic Sungkyunkwan, founded in 1398 and located in central Seoul. As the foremost educational institution of the Joseon Dynasty, it was governed by the great code of the state administration with royal assent. It was restructured as a comprehensive university in the late 19th century, and has since greatly expanded its course offerings.

The university spends heavily on research and development, mostly sponsored by Samsung, Hyundai, and government agencies, producing high-end research scientists including chemical engineering professor Park Nam-Gyu, who was named a Clarivate Citation Laureate in 2017 by Clarivate Analytics, and physics professor Lee Young-hee, director of the Center for Integrated Nanostructure Physics in the Institute for Basic Science. Both scientists frequently appear in Nature.

Location
The university's Humanities and Social Sciences Campus, also housing arts departments, is in central Seoul on the same hill as Changdeokgung and Changgyeonggung (two of the royal palaces of Joseon). It is near Hyehwa-dong and Daehangno. The nearest subway station is Hyehwa Station on Seoul Subway Line 4.

The Natural Sciences Campus, housing natural science, engineering, medicine, and sports departments, is within walking distance of Sungkyunkwan University Station in the northwest of Suwon. The 101-hectare campus, 45 km south of Seoul, was established in 1978.

History

Sungkyunkwan was established in 1398 as the Joseon Dynasty's highest educational institution.  Its name means, "Sung (成, to make), Kyun (均, harmonious society), Kwan (館, institute)." It focused on an in-depth study of the Chinese Classics, Confucian canon, and literature of the era, and how to apply the knowledge to governing the nation and understanding the nature of humanity. It also served as a shrine (see Munmyo) to the Confucian sages where rituals were held regularly to honor them and their teachings.

It was located within the city walls of Hanseong (modern-day Seoul), the capital during the Joseon period. It followed the example of the Goryeo-period Gukjagam, which in its latter years was also known by the name "Sungkyunkwan".

Numerous Korean historical figures, including Yi Hwang and Yi I, studied at and graduated from Sungkyunkwan. A considerable amount of Korean literature and works of hanja calligraphy were created and archived by Sungkyunkwan scholars over the centuries.

Ancient University Period (1398-1894) 
The history of Sungkyunkwan University can be divided  into the ancient university period, the modern university period, and the contemporary university period. The ancient university period was from 1398 to 1894. During this period, traditional Korean Confucianism education was practiced, and institutional operation was also ancient.

The ancient university period can be divided into three periods as follows.

The first period is the period of establishment, from 1398 to  1494, that is, from the establishment of Sungkyunkwan during the reign of King Taejo of Joseon to the time of King Seongjong of Joseon. During this period, buildings were constructed, systems were established, and operating policies were established, and the system of the top national university was completed.

The second period is the period of recession, from 1495 to 1724, that is, from Yeonsan-gun to Gyeongjong. During this period, due to the tyranny of Yeonsangun of Joseon, it was reduced to a place where Sungkyunkwan held a feast. It was only restored to its original state after King Jungjong of Joseon's accession. Also, during the reign of King Seonjo of Joseon, Sungkyunkwan was burnt down during the Japanese invasions of Korea (1592–1598), and it was rebuilt.

The third period is the period of revival, from 1725 to 1894, that is, from the reign of Yeongjo of Joseon to the time of Gabo Reform. During this period, the education of Sungkyunkwan became lively amid the political and academic revival, and the theory of reformation of the education system was actively developed by Silhak scholars.

Modern university period (1895~1945) 
The modern university period can also be roughly divided into three periods.

The first period was the Enlightenment period from 1895 to 1910, that is, from the time Sungkyunkwan was founded as a modern university to Japanese annexation of Korea. In 1895, a three-year department of Chinese Classics (Korean: 경학과; Hanja: 經學科; RR:gyeonghakkwa) was established in Sungkyunkwan, and various courses such as history, geography, and mathematics were opened. At the same time, the professor appointment system, admission examination system, and graduation examination system were implemented, a semester system was introduced, and modern institutional reforms were carried out, such as setting the number of teaching days per year and the number of lecture hours per week. As a result, Sungkyunkwan was transformed from an ancient university to a modern university.

The second period, the period of ordeal, is Korea under Japanese rule. Sungkyunkwan lost its educational function as the highest school in Joseon.

Contemporary University Period (1945~Present) 
The period of development, the third period of the modern university period, means the contemporary university period.

In  1945, the Japanese Empire was defeated. In November of the same year, Kim Chang-sook led the Sungkyunkwan University preparatory association. Sungkyunkwan University was established by collecting some of the property of the Hyanggyo and collecting donations from Confucian scholars.

After the Korean War, as  the nation modernized and underwent social, political, and economic reforms, SKKU played an important role in academic freedom in higher education and also kept traditional ethics and morality alive in Korean society.

Partnership with Samsung

Samsung partnered with SKKU in the period of 1965–1977 and renewed the partnership in 1996. The partnership has helped SKKU realize its vision in pursuit of globalization and fostering talented graduates. Through the partnership, SKKU has developed high-quality research infrastructure and achieved excellent human resource management. The partnership also enabled SKKU to develop world-leading academic programs in software development, mobile communications engineering, energy engineering, nanotechnology, business, medicine, and law.

Through the Samsung Global Scholarship Program (GSP), each year 15–25 students are selected for Seoul National University's engineering program or SKKU's Graduate School of Business (SKK GSB). Selected GSP students currently study for three semesters. Previously, it was four semesters, including a possibility of spending a semester at one of SKK GSB's top partner universities in the United States (MIT Sloan School of Management, Columbia University, Northwestern University's Kellogg School of Management, University of Michigan's Ross School of Business, Dartmouth College's Tuck School of Business or Indiana University's Kelley School of Business).

Rankings and reputation

According to the ranking of South Korean universities annually published by national daily newspaper JoongAng Daily, Sungkyunkwan University is ranked nationally as the second best university in South Korea after Seoul National University. For several years, U.S. News & World Report ranked Sungkyunkwan University second university in South Korea after SNU.

Internationally, SKKU is ranked 88th in the Quacquarelli Symonds (QS) world university rankings 2021. In the Times Higher Education 2019 world university rankings, SKKU is ranked 82nd.

In the QS Asia rankings, SKKU is ranked 15th. The reputation of the university stems from SKKU's international engagement including short-term study abroad programs and dual-degree programs, as well as its industrial partnerships, and its graduate reputation as evidenced in the high employment rate of SKKU graduates.

In the Financial Times, SKK GSB's MBA is ranked 35th worldwide, seventh in Asia, and first in Korea.

SKKU's School of Medicine is affiliated with Samsung Medical Center, the top research hospital in Korea.

Motto

SKKU's motto, "Humanity, Righteousness, Propriety, and Wisdom" (仁, 義, 禮, 智),  reflects the basic spirit of Confucianism. These four cardinal virtues express humankind's four inherent elements of spirit, action, conscience, and intellect. Humanity abides in the heart that loves, righteousness abides in the heart that knows right from wrong, propriety abides in the heart that knows forbearance, and wisdom abides in the heart that perceives. Confucian philosophy attests to man's innate goodness, and at the same time recognizes that this quality must nevertheless be awakened and nurtured. These four principles, which comprise SKKU's educational philosophy, are the basis for higher education's goals of the search for truth and the establishment of social justice, which are, in turn, based on humanity.

University symbol

The university's symbol—the ginkgo leaf—is derived from the giant ginkgo trees (Natural Monument No. 59) at Myeongnyundang. Both trees are male, and thus do not bear fruit. They are believed to have been planted in 1519 by Yun Tak, a former chief scholar of Sungkyunkwan.

Campuses

Humanities and Social Sciences Campus 
The Humanities and Social Sciences Campus is located behind Sungkyunkwan. The campus includes the 600th Anniversary Building, Student Center, Central Library, Faculty Hall, International Hall, Business School, Hoam Hall, Dasan Hall of Economics, Toegye Hall of Humanities, Suseon Hall, Law School and more.

Natural Sciences Campus

Samsung Library 
The library is equipped with state-of-the art digital media room where students can have recreational activity like watching movies. The library also offers several CD player stations for amusements, open cafe and sleeping arena where students can take nap if tired.

Learning Factory 
SKKU Learning Factory is a student facility at Natural Sciences campus in Suwon where creative ideas can be made into a prototype product using 3D printers, laser cutters, CNC router, and Arduino. It has been established by the Fusion Based Creative Informatics Human Resources Development Team, and it serves as a place where students can realize their ideas and build human connections.

Student housing and dormitories
Sungkyunkwan University offers on-campus dormitories to its students on the campuses which are known as SKKU dorms. Humanities and Social Sciences campus in Seoul offers ten dormitories and housing facilities namely, E-house, G-house, K-house, C-house, I-house, M-house, Crownville A, Crownville C, Victory House, and LWG House whereas, the Natural Sciences Campus in Suwon offers five dormitories namely, In-Gwan, Ui-Gwan, Ye-gwan, Shin-Gwan and Ji-Gwan. Dorm culture of the university is vibrant, owing to frequent recreational events such as free pizza parties, outdoor trips, painting competitions, Yoga classes, and so on, targeting its international students. The dorm entrances are secured with automatic RFID key-tag doors which ensure only the students can have legal entry inside. Routine fire-safety and earthquake-safety simulations in the dorms are performed every semester to ensure the safety of the students.

Rooms
The dormitories house both male and female students but floors are designated for a specific gender. SKKU dorms provide variety of room types depending on the need, fee and academic results. Students can be offered single/two/four person rooms. Apartment-type facilities are also offered where more than four students live in separate rooms in an apartment. All the rooms are equipped with furniture, air-conditioner and free wifi. Special single rooms are reserved for disabled students in Shin-gwan dorm.

Research institutes

Sungkyunkwan Advanced Institute of Nanotechnology

Sungkyunkwan Advanced Institute of Nanotechnology (SAINT) was founded on 1 March 2005 as one of the four core programs of Sungkyunkwan University's VISION2010+ plan to be ranked in the top 100 universities in the world. With financial support from Samsung Advanced Institute of Technology, its goal is to become one of the world's top 5 nanotechnology-related institutes. The current director of SAINT is Michael Grätzel.

N-Center

N-Center is the home of the Center for Integrated Nanostructure Physics in the Institute for Basic Science and the Center for Neuroscience Imaging Research (CNIR). Professor Lee Young-hee, an internationally renowned physicist engaged in nanotechnology research, is the director.

International programs

Sungkyunkwan University has a high number of international students, making up over 10% of the total undergraduate student body. In 2011, the population of international students at SKKU surpassed 1,000. There were over 2,700 international students enrolled at SKKU in 2013, and each year more than 2,000 Korean students from SKKU go abroad. SKKU maintains partnerships with over 653 universities in over 73 countries around the world, and has agreements with 21 overseas institutions to offer dual-degree programs.

Facilities

When Sungkyunkwan University was established in 1946, Jongyeonggak, Bicheondang and Myeongnyundang were used as libraries. After that, a new library was built. A library was opened on the Natural Sciences Campus in 1979, and a Library of Medicine was established in 1998. In 1999, the Law Library was opened. In 2000, Jongyeonggak was newly established. Currently, the Central Library of the Humanities and Social Sciences Campus and the Samsung Library of the Natural Sciences Campus are the core libraries. It has more than 2.15 million books. It has the ninth largest collection of books among university libraries in South Korea.

University Area: 3,593,341 m2
Humanities and Social Sciences Campus: 1,394,154 m² / Natural Sciences Campus: 2,199,187 m²
(including Tobong Varsity Teams Training Center: 61,339 m² / Botanical Gardens: 329,222 m² /
Samchuk Seaside Retreat: 2,390 m²)

Building Area: 344,510 m2
Humanities and Social Sciences Campus: 141,803 m²
Natural Sciences Campus: 202,707 m²

Sports facilities
Under the College of Sports Science, several student sports clubs at Sungkyunkwan University are active including baseball club, floor ball club, tennis club, basketball club, soccer club, volleyball club, and cricket club. Full-size soccer field, basketball playground and baseball fields are located inside the campus.

Notable alumni

Politics, diplomacy and public service
 Hwang Kyo-ahn (황교안), former Prime Minister of South Korea, former Acting President of South Korea
 Lee Wan-koo (이완구), former Prime Minister of South Korea
 Chung Hong-won (정홍원), former Prime Minister of South Korea
 Lee Young-jin (이영진), Justice of the Constitutional Court of Korea
 Park Byeong-seug (박병석), Chairman of the National Assembly, National Assembly member for Seo District (Daejeon)
 Yang Seung-jo (양승조), Governor of South Chungcheong Province, former National Assembly member for Cheonan
 Ko Chang-soo (고창수), former Consul General in Seattle, Washington; former Ambassador to Ethiopia and Pakistan
 Lee Jong-seok (이종석), former Minister of Unification
 Choung Byoung-gug (정병국), former Minister of Culture, Sports and Tourism, member of the National Assembly for Yeoju and Yangpyeong County
 Ahn Gyu-back (안규백), member of the National Assembly for Dongdaemun District (Seoul)
 Park Yong-jin (박용진), member of the National Assembly for Gangbuk District (Seoul)
 Choi Gyung-hwan (최경환) member of the National Assembly for Buk District (Gwangju)

Sports 
 Han Hong-gyu (한홍규), Midfielder for Chungju Hummel FC
 Jung Kwang-seok (정광석), Retired football player and manager for Yongin City FC
 Kim Deok-il (김덕일), Forward for Seongnam FC
 Kim In-sung (김인성), Midfielder for Jeonbuk Hyundai Motors
 Kim Mi-hyun (김미현), Professional golfer
 Lee Ho-jin (이호진), Defender 
 Lee Jong-won (이종원), Midfielder for Seongnam FC
 Lee Sang-gi (이상기), Goalkeeper for Suwon FC
 Lim Joong-yong (임중용), Retired football player and coach
 Mo Chang-min (모창민), Infielder for NC Dinos
 No Jin-hyuk (노진혁), Shortstop for NC Dinos
 Yoon Deok-yeo (윤덕여), Retired football player and coach
 Kim Byung-hyun (김병현), Former Major League Baseball Pitcher
 Jeon Kwang-in (전광인), Men's National Volleyball Player
 Seo Jae-duck (서재덕), Men's National Volleyball Player

Entertainment

 Bae Yong-joon (배용준), Actor and businessman
 Carlos Gorito (카를로스 고리토), South Korea-based Brazilian television personality
 Cha Eun-woo (차은우), Actor and member of South Korean boy band Astro
 Eunseo (은서), Member of South Korean-Chinese girl group WJSN
 Go Ah-sung (고아성), Actress
 Han Soo-yeon (한수연), Actress
 Heo Young-joo (허영주), Former member of South Korean girl group The SeeYa
 Hwang In-sun (황인선), Singer
 Hyomin (효민), Actress and member of South Korean girl group T-ara
 Jeon Sung-woo (전성우), Actor
 Ji Hyun-woo (지현우), Actor
 Jo Bo-ah (조보아), Actress
 Joo Won (주원), Actor
 Jung Hye-sung (정혜성), Actress
 Kang Ji-young (강지영), Actress and former member of South Korean girl group KARA
 Kim Dae-myung (김대명), Actor
 Kim Ga-young (김가영), Actress and former member of South Korean girl group Stellar
 Kim Hye-soo (김혜수), Actress
 Kim Mu-yeol (김무열), Actor
 Kim Nam-joo (김남주), Member of South Korean girl group Apink
 Ko Sung-hee (고성희), Actress
 Krystal Jung (정수정), Korean-American actress and member of South Korean girl group f(x)
 Kwak Jung-wook (곽정욱), Actor
 Ku Hye-sun (구혜선), Actress
 Lee El (이엘), Actress
 Lee Min-jung (이민정), Actress
 Lee Si-a (이시아), Actress and former member of South Korean girl group CHI CHI
 Lee Tae-hwan (이태환), Actor and former member of South Korean boy band 5urprise
 Moon Ga-young (문가영), Actress
 Moon Geun-young (문근영), Actress
 Moon So-ri (문소리), Actress
 Park Chul-soo (박철수), Film director and screenwriter
 Park Joo-mi (박주미), Actress
 Park Se-wan (박세완), Actress
 Park Sol-mi (박솔미), Actress
 Park So-hyun (박소현), Actress
 Seo Ji-hye (서지혜), Actress
 Seo Shin-ae (서신애), Actress
 Shin Ye-eun (신예은), Actress
 Song Joong-ki (송중기), Actor
 Swings (문지훈), Rapper
 Uee (유이), Actress and former member of South Korean girl group After School
 Yang Hye-ji (양혜지), Actress

Historical figures
Yi Gae(1417-1456): Entered in 1436. Six martyred ministers, Compilation of Dongguk Jeongun.

See also

List of universities and colleges in South Korea
Education in the Joseon Dynasty
Sungkyunkwan
Education in South Korea
Daehangno
Samsung Global Scholarship Program

References

External links 
 Official site

 
Educational institutions established in 1946
1946 establishments in Korea
Educational institutions established in the 14th century
14th-century establishments in Korea
1398 establishments in Asia
Private universities and colleges in South Korea
Universities and colleges in Seoul
Universities and colleges in Suwon
Confucian universities and colleges
Jongno District
Samsung